Wild Decembers may refer to:
 Wild Decembers (novel), a 1999 novel by Edna O'Brien
 Wild Decembers (TV series), a 2010 Irish TV series, based on the novel